The 4th IAAF World Indoor Championships in Athletics were held at the Skydome in Toronto, Ontario, Canada from March 12 to March 14, 1993. It was the last Indoor Championships to feature the 5,000 and 3,000 metres race walk events. In addition, it was the first Indoor Championships to include heptathlon and pentathlon, albeit as non-championship events. There were a total number of 537 athletes participated from 93 countries.

Results

Men
1989 | 1991 | 1993 | 1995 | 1997

 For doping offenses, the Bulgarians Daniel Ivanov and Nikolai Raev were disqualified from the bronze medals in long and triple jump respectively.

Women
1989 | 1991 | 1993 | 1995 | 1997

 The Russian 4 × 400 m relay team won the event and was awarded the gold medal, but was later disqualified when Marina Shmonina was found to have been doping.

Non-championship events
Some events were contested without counting towards the total medal status. The 1600 metres medley relay consisted of four legs over 800 m, 200 m, 200 m and 400 m.

Medal table

Participating nations

  (1)
  (2)
  (1)
  (1)
  (10)
  (6)
  (5)
  (2)
  (6)
  (7)
  (2)
  (1)
  (1)
  (8)
  (7)
  (2)
  (37)
  (1)
  (1)
  (2)
  (12)
  (2)
  (1)
  (13)
  (8)
  (3)
  (1)
  (2)
  (1)
  (9)
  (15)
  (29)
  (2)
  (26)
  (7)
  (1)
  (6)
  (2)
  (6)
  (2)
  (19)
  (2)
  (15)
  (8)
  (3)
  (3)
  (1)
  (1)
  (5)
  (6)
  (2)
  (2)
  (1)
  (1)
  (1)
  (2)
  (6)
  (1)
  (1)
  (9)
  (1)
  (2)
  (6)
  (1)
  (1)
  (6)
  (7)
  (2)
  (2)
  (19)
  (34)
  (1)
  (2)
  (1)
  (1)
  (4)
  (3)
  (5)
  (2)
  (18)
  (2)
  (9)
  (7)
  (1)
  (4)
  (2)
  (2)
  (13)
  (56)
  (1)
  (1)
  (1)
  (1)

See also
 1993 in athletics (track and field)

References

External links
 GBR Athletics
 Athletics Australia
  (German)

 
IAAF World Indoor Championships
IAAF World Indoor Championships
1993 in Toronto
World Athletics Indoor Championships
International track and field competitions hosted by Canada
International sports competitions in Toronto
March 1993 sports events in Canada